Morten Veland (born 4 December 1977) is a Norwegian musician. He is one of the founding members of the gothic metal band Tristania and the founding member of Sirenia and Mortemia.

Background 
At the age of 14, Veland began saving to buy his first electric guitar. He would lock himself up and practice everyday and night. Veland was inspired by Guns N' Roses's Appetite For Destruction and Alice Cooper's Trash to make a career out of music and afterwards by The Sisters of Mercy, Fields of the Nephilim, and The Mission amongst others.

Career

Early days 
In 1992, Veland entered the music scene when he was just 15 years old. He and bandmate Kenneth Olsson, who would later form Tristania, formed Uzi Suicide. They were described as a fusion of Rock and Metal. However, his interest grew more into the UK Gothic scene. It inspired his songwriting into a darker and gloomier musical feel.  Fragments of Uzi Suicide turned into Tristania.

1995–2001: Tristania 
In 1995, he co-founded Tristania and at 19 signed his first record deal. Veland released 2 albums and couple EP's with the band. Tristania became one of the leading acts in the genre at the time. They toured throughout the American continent and also in Europe. The band performed in some of the biggest music festivals in Europe.
Whilst in Tristania, he was the main lyricist, songwriter and guitarist as well as being responsible for the growling vocals, until he left Tristania after the first two full-length albums due to social and musical differences.

2001–present: Sirenia 

After Tristania, in 2001, Veland formed his own band Sirenia, composing the same genre of music, in which he contributes nearly all of the instruments as well as the growling vocals. The rest of the band (except female singer and choir members) are mostly used on live performances only.

Mortemia 
While taking Sirenia on a more melodic direction, Veland began writing other types of music. He ended up with many great ideas but it didn't really fit his current band's musical concept. He since decided to form Mortemia. The music has a similar style to that of Tristania's second album Beyond the Veil. The band signed a contract with Napalm Records on 6 July 2009. Mortemia is a studio project only, but he is considering doing a live lineup in the future.  After 11 years of inactivity, Veland announced a brand new EP titled The Pandemic Pandemonium Sessions on 11 May 2021. This EP is an entirely different concept which will feature many different female vocalists in each song.

Influence 
He cites Guns N' Roses, Metallica, Leonard Cohen, The Sisters of Mercy, Fields of the Nephilim, The Mission, Tiamat, Nick Cave, and Paradise Lost as his chief influences.

Personal life 
Veland has his own recording studio called Audio Avenue (until 2010 named Stargoth Studios) in Tau village, Rogaland, where he lives regularly. He works as a producer and engineer. During his spare time he collects cognacs, red wines, and beers. He enjoys playing chess, fishing, and hiking. He is married to Elaine, they have a couple of children together.
.

Discography

Tristania

Demos 
Tristania (EP, 1997)

Albums 
Widow's Weeds (1998)
Beyond the Veil (1999)

Singles 
Angina (1999)

Live albums 
Widow's Tour (1999)
Widow's Tour/Angina (1999)

Compilation albums 
Midwintertears / Angina (2001)
Midwinter Tears (2005)

Music videos 
Evenfall (1998)

Sirenia

Demos 
Sirenian Shores (EP, 2004)

Albums 
At Sixes and Sevens (2002)
An Elixir For Existence (2004)
Nine Destinies and a Downfall (2007)
The 13th Floor (2009)
The Enigma of Life (2011)
Perils of the Deep Blue (2013)
The Seventh Life Path (2015)
Dim Days of Dolor (2016)
Arcane Astral Aeons (2018)
Riddles, Ruins & Revelations (2021)

Singles 
 My Mind's Eye (2007)
 The Path to Decay (2009)
 The End of It All (2011)
 Seven Widows Weep (2013)
 Once My Light (2015)
 The 12th Hour (2016)
 Dim Days of Dolor (2016)
 Love Like Cyanide (2018)
 Into the Night (2018)
 Addiction No. 1 (2020)
 We Come to Ruins (2021)
 Voyage, voyage (2021, Desireless cover)

Music videos 
 My Mind's Eye (2007)
 The Other Side (2007)
 The Path to Decay (2009)
 The End of It All (2011)
 Seven Widows Weep (2013)
 Addiction No. 1 (2020)
 Voyage, voyage (2021, Desireless cover)

Mortemia

Albums 
Misere Mortem (2010)

EPs 
The Pandemic Pandemonium Sessions (2021)
The Covid Aftermath Sessions (2022-2023)

Music videos 
 The One I Once Was (2010)

References

External links 
Sirenia' Official Website
Mortemia' Official Website

1977 births
Living people
Norwegian heavy metal guitarists
Norwegian heavy metal singers
Norwegian multi-instrumentalists
Norwegian rock guitarists
Norwegian rock singers
Norwegian songwriters
Musicians from Stavanger
Place of birth missing (living people)
21st-century Norwegian singers
21st-century Norwegian guitarists
21st-century Norwegian male singers